Nino Kochlamazashvili (born 2 February 1991) is a Georgian footballer who plays as a midfielder. She has been a member of the Georgia women's national team.

References

1991 births
Living people
Women's association football midfielders
Women's footballers from Georgia (country)
Georgia (country) women's international footballers